Barreales is a Chilean village located in Santa Cruz, Colchagua Province, Libertador General Bernardo O'Higgins Region.

It was also formerly known as (El) Barrial, (Los) Barriales, and Los Barreales.

References

Populated places in Colchagua Province